Founded in 2012 and based in Sydney, GlamCorner is an online service that provides designer fashion rentals for women in Australia.

The company rents out dresses, gowns, playsuits, jumpsuits, jackets, and accessories.

In April 2015, GlamCorner received investment from AirTree Ventures, a Sydney-based VC-fund specialising in businesses that are disrupting traditional markets.

In July 2017, GlamCorner raised series A from AirTree Ventures, Sass & Bide co-founder Sarah-Jane Clarke, Marshall Investments, Impact Investment Group's Giant Leap and Partners For Growth.

Achievements & Milestones 
GlamCorner is a certified B Corporation | January 2018
GlamCorner accepted the Banksia Foundation's Sustainability Award for medium-sized businesses at their 2018 Annual Awards Gala in Melbourne.

References

Online companies of Australia
Technology companies established in 2012
Retail companies established in 2012
Sharing economy
Clothing rental companies